Avni Mula (Gjakova, 4 January 1928 – Tirana, 29 October 2020) was an Albanian singer, composer, and musician. For his contribution to the arts, he received two of the highest awards from the Albanian government: the People's Artist of Albania decoration and the Honor of the Nation decoration.

Personal life
Mula's family moved from Gjakova, Kosova to Shkodër, Albania, when he was young, and after World War II, he moved to Tirana, Albania. He studied at the Tchaikovsky Conservatory and graduated in 1957 as a lyric singer. While studying in Moscow, he married Nina Nula (23 November 1931–12 December 2011), a Russian woman from Izhevsk. He is the father of soprano Inva Mula.

Career

Singing
Mula was part of the National Troupe of Songs and Dances and the Troupe of the Army. In addition, he won many prizes over his career as a composer and singer in the Festivali i Këngës (Albanian Festival of Song), which is held every year in Tirana. Mula was a baritone.

Composition
Mula composed many songs over the span of his career. Some of the most famous are:
 "Nënë Moj Do Pres Gërshetin" (Mother, I'll cut Off My Braid), which won first prize in the 1976 Festival and was interpreted by Vaçe Zela.
 "Këngët e atdheut tim" (Songs of My Country)
 "Valsi i Lumturisë" (The Waltz of Happiness).
 "Një Djep Në Barrikadë" (A Cradle on the Barricade), sung by Marina Grabovari. The song won first prize in the 1982 Festival.

Mula also wrote an opera, Nënë Shqipëri (Mother Albania) and two compositions for the films Lume Drite (River of Light) and Karnavalet (Carnivals).

Festival jury
In 1998, Mula, head of the jury of the Festivali i Këngës, declared Albërie Hadërgjonaj's song "Mirësia Dhe e Vërteta" the winner, making Hadërgjonaj the first Kosovar-Albanian singer to ever win the festival.

Awards and recognition
Mula received two of the highest awards from the Albanian government: the People's Artist of Albania decoration and the Honor of the Nation decoration.

References

External links

1928 births
2020 deaths
Musicians from Gjakova
Kosovo Albanians
Albanian composers
20th-century Albanian male singers
Albanian opera composers
People's Artists of Albania
Male classical composers
People from Shkodër
Musicians from Tirana
Yugoslav emigrants to Albania
Festivali i Këngës winners